is a railway station on the Hanshin Main Line in Nada-ku, Kobe, Hyōgo Prefecture, Japan, operated by the private railway operator Hanshin Electric Railway.

Overview
The station has two elevated side platforms serving two tracks.

Layout

Surrounding area 
 Maya Station on the JR Kobe Line (opening March 2016)
 Iwaya Intersection where Japan National Route 2 (国道2号) and Japan National Route 43 (国道43号) merge.

History 
Nishinada Station opened on the Hanshin Main Line on 1 July 1927.

Station numbering was introduced on 21 December 2013, with Kasuganomichi being designated as station number HS-29.

Gallery

See also 
 List of railway stations in Japan

References

External links

 Station website 

Railway stations in Japan opened in 1927
Railway stations in Hyōgo Prefecture